Ryan Townsend (born 2 September 1985) is an Australian footballer.

Biography
Townsend was born in Manchester, in the United Kingdom, but was raised in Perth, Western Australia. His father was a former professional footballer, George Townsend. After growing up in Australia he returned to the UK having earned a place in Burnley's youth development set-up. Townsend could have stayed at Burnley but they could not extend his contract due to ECU Joondalup (his club in Perth) demanding a large development fee. Townsend instead returned to Perth where he started to train with Perth Glory before playing two games in 2005 on a short-term contract. Townsend then joined Wanneroo City in the Football West State League, before he was offered a full-time contract with Perth Glory in place of Daniel Vasilevski for the A-League 2006-07 season. He was released four games before the end of the A-League season after a single appearance and then decided to play in Indonesia with Persiba Balikpapan until 2008.

Australian career
He has played for the Australian U20 side, the "Young Socceroos", three times. A highlight for Townsend was scoring against Japan in the 2005 FIFA World Youth Championship.

References

1985 births
Living people
Footballers from Manchester
Australian soccer players
Australian expatriate soccer players
Australian expatriate sportspeople in England
English footballers
A-League Men players
Burnley F.C. players
Wanneroo City SC players
Perth Glory FC players
Persiba Balikpapan players
English Football League players
Expatriate footballers in Indonesia
Association football central defenders